nine*nine is a limited edition box set of Gackt's video lives released on October 29, 2008. It collects the artist's previous live concerts on 13 CD's. The box also contains a bonus DVD featuring interviews, miniature booklets of all tours, and two unreleased songs; "Justified", and 1997's cover of song "Kizudarake No Lola" by Hideki Saijo. It reached number thirty-four on Oricon.

Track listing

2000 -  (MARS Sora Kara no Homonsha~Kaisou~)

2001 -  (Requiem et Reminiscence ~Shuuen to Seijyaku~)

CD 1

CD 2

2002 -  (Kagen no Tsuki —Seiya no Shirabe—)

CD 1

CD 2

2003 -  (Jogen no Tsuki —Saishusho—)

CD 1

CD 2

2004 -

CD 1

CD 2

2005 -  (DIABOLOS〜Aien no Shi to Seiya no Namida〜)

CD 1

CD 2

2006 - Gackt Training Days D.R.U.G. Party

CD 1

CD 2

References

Gackt compilation albums